Muž Roku Slovenskej Republiky or Muž Roku SR is an annual national male beauty pageant that selects Slovak Republic's representatives to participate globally.

History
Muž Roku Slovenskej Republiky was established in 2008 by Muž Roku Organization. The winner of Muž Roku Slovenskej Republiky competes in Mister International and the runners-up compete in Men Universe Model and Manhunt International pageants.

In 2010 Peter Meňky named as Manhunt International 2010 in China. He was Muž Roku Slovenskej Republiky 2009 crowned by Muž Roku Organization.

Since 2013 Muž Roku Slovenskej Republiky does not compete together in the same pageant of Muž Roku national contest. The last representative of Slovak Republic in Mister International was Michal Gajdošech, 1st Runner-up in 2011 who competed at the Mister International 2013 in Indonesia.

Titleholders

Muž Roku Slovenskej Republiky International Pageants
Color key

Mister International

Manhunt International
Between 1994 and 1999 the Mister Slovak Republic delegates for Manhunt International were not selected by Muž Roku Organization.

Men Universe Model

See also
Muž Roku
Miss Universe Slovenskej Republiky

References

External links
Official Muž Roku SR website

Slovak Republic
Recurring events established in 2008
Slovak awards